Charles Simmons may refer to:

Charles Simmons (gymnast) (1885–1945), British gymnast who competed in the 1912 Summer Olympics
Charles Simmons (author) (1924–2017), American editor and novelist
Charles Simmons (author, born 1798), American clergyman and author
Charles Simmons (politician) (1893–1975), British Lord of the Treasury and later Parliamentary Secretary to the Minister for Pensions, Labour Government, 1945–1951
Charles F. Simmons (1858–1897), American farmer and politician
Charles F. Simmons (footballer) (1880–1911), English footballer with Athletic Bilbao and Real Sociedad
Chippy Simmons (Charles Simmons, 1878–1937), English footballer with West Brom, West Ham and Chesterfield